The Pleasures of Japanese Literature is a short nonfiction work by Donald Keene, which deals with Japanese aesthetics and literature; it is intended to be less academic and encyclopedic than his other works dealing with Japanese literature such as Seeds in the Heart, but better as an introduction for students and laymen. This aim is unsurprising, as Keene notes in his introduction that "This book originated as five lectures, three delivered at the New York Public Library in the spring of 1986, the fourth at the University of California at Los Angeles in 1986, and the last at the Metropolitan Museum of Art in New York in 1987.....The lectures - and this book - were intended for a general audience..." (from the first page of the Preface).

Chapters
Specifically, its five chapters deal with:
Japanese Aesthetics - (wabi, mono no aware, etc.)
Japanese Poetry - (classical waka, some renga and haiku)
The Uses of Japanese Poetry
Japanese Fiction - (Tsurezuregusa, Yoshida Kenkō, Biography of Eight Dogs)
Japanese Theater - (Noh, Kabuki, Bunraku)

External links
Review in The New York Times

Japanese literature
1988 non-fiction books
Books of literary criticism